Hettstedt was a Verwaltungsgemeinschaft ("collective municipality") in the Mansfeld-Südharz district, in Saxony-Anhalt, Germany. The seat of the Verwaltungsgemeinschaft was in Hettstedt. It was disbanded in September 2010.

The Verwaltungsgemeinschaft Hettstedt consisted of the following municipalities:

 Hettstedt
 Ritterode 
 Walbeck

Former Verwaltungsgemeinschaften in Saxony-Anhalt